Charles II François Frédéric de Montmorency (December 31, 1702 - May 18, 1764), was the eighth Duke of Piney-Luxembourg and the second Duke of Montmorency (Beaufort), prince of Aigremont and of Tingry, count of Bouteville, of Lassé 1, of Dangu and of Luxe, peer of France, marshal of France in 1757 and the governor of Normandy in 1762. He was the son of Charles I Francois Frederic de Montmorency-Luxembourg and grandson of Marshal François-Henri de Montmorency, duc de Luxembourg. His mother was Marie-Gilonne Gillier de Clérembault, daughter of René. 

He gave refuge to Jean-Jacques Rousseau, the famous French philosopher, at the "Small Castle" at Montmorency during 1759–1762 (an area which was owned by Charles Le Brun and Pierre Crozat; was distinguished from another stay of Rousseau in Montmorency: Mont-Louis, previously offered by Mr. Mathas, tax attorney for the Prince of Condé) when he was quarreling with Madame d'Epinay, his protectress.

Notes

References
 
 Jean Baptiste Ladvocat, in deutscher Übersetzung als: Historisches Hand-Wörterbuch, Ulm 1786. Sp. 1414–1418: Karl Franz Friedrich von Montmorency (Digitalisat)
 Nicolas Viton de Saint-Allais: L’Art de vérifier les dates des faits historiques, des chartes, des chroniques, et autres anciens monuments, depuis la naissance de Notre-Seigneur. Band XII. Paris 1818. S. 67–68 (Digitalisat)

Marshals of France
House of Montmorency
Order of the Holy Spirit
1702 births
1764 deaths